Claus Jönsson (born 26 May 1930) is a German physicist who in 1961 performed for the first time a version of the double-slit experiment with a single electron. In 2002 it was named "the most beautiful experiment" by readers of Physics World.

References

20th-century German physicists
1930 births
Living people